Paternion is a market town in the district of Villach-Land in the Austrian state of Carinthia.

Geography
Paternion is subdivided into six Katastralgemeinden: Feistritz an der Drau, Kamering, Kreuzen, Nikelsdorf, Paternion and Rubland.

History
Settled since the Hallstatt culture, the place was first mentioned as St. Paternianus in a 1296 deed, named after Saint Paternian, the Bishop of Fano, as the area south of the Drava then belonged to the Patriarchate of Aquileia. In 1530 Paternion received market rights from Archduke Ferdinand I of Austria. With a percentage of about 30%, the municipality is today one of the centres of Protestantism in Carinthia.

Paternion Castle was part of the Lordship of Paternion (Herrschaft Paternion), together with the castles at Pöllan and Kreuzen and 8,800 hectares of forests. In the late 19th century they passed from the counts Widmann-Rezzonico to count Piero Foscari from Venice, and they are still today owned by the Foscari-Widmann-Rezzonico family.

Politics
Seats in the municipal assembly (Gemeinderat)  elections:
Social Democratic Party of Austria (SPÖ): 18
Freedom Party of Austria (FPÖ): 2
Austrian People's Party (ÖVP): 2
The Greens - The Green Alternative: 1

Notable people
 Mr. Bond, far-right rapper

Twin town
 Ladenburg, Germany

References

External links

Cities and towns in Villach-Land District
Gailtal Alps